Guanqiao may refer to:

 Guanqiao Station (官桥站), future elevated station of Guangzhou Metro's Line 4
Guanqiao Township (官桥乡), in Liuyang City, Hunan
Towns (官桥镇)
Guanqiao, Xiao County, in Xiao County, Anhui
Guanqiao, Anxi County, in Anxi County, Fujian
Guanqiao, Nan'an, Fujian, in Nan'an City, Fujian
Guanqiao, Huazhou, in Huazhou, Guangdong
Guanqiao, Jiayu County, in Jiayu County, Hubei
Guanqiao, Tengzhou, in Tengzhou City, Shandong